Péter Darázs (born October 12, 1985 in Jászberény) is a Hungarian short track speed skater.

Darázs competed at the 2006 and 2010 Winter Olympics. for Hungary. In 2006, he advanced to the quarterfinals in the 500 and 1000 metre races, but did not advance further from there. In the 1500 metres, he advanced to the B Final, after placing 4th in the semifinal. He placed 6th, last out of the field, in the final, and 11th overall. His best finish in Torino was 10th, in the 500 metres. In the 2010 500 metres, he placed fourth in his round one heat, failing to advance. In the 1500 metres, he placed 3rd in his opening heat, but 7th in the semifinal, failing to advance to the finals. His best overall finish was in the 1500, where he placed 19th.

As of 2013, Darázs's best performance at the World Championships came in 2006, when he placed 12th in the 1500 metres. He has also won two medals as a member of the Hungarian relay team at the European Championships.

As of 2013, Darázs has not finished on the podium on the ISU Short Track Speed Skating World Cup. His top World Cup ranking is 11th, in the overall in 2005–06.

References

External links 
 
 
 

1985 births
Living people
Hungarian male short track speed skaters
Olympic short track speed skaters of Hungary
Short track speed skaters at the 2006 Winter Olympics
Short track speed skaters at the 2010 Winter Olympics
People from Jászberény
Sportspeople from Jász-Nagykun-Szolnok County